Harley Towler (born 11 December 1992) is a badminton player from England. He started playing badminton at age 7. In 2012 and 2013, he became Loughborough Sportsman of the Year. He was educated at the William Farr School and graduated from Loughborough University with a sport & exercise science degree.

Achievements

BWF International Challenge/Series 
Men's doubles

Mixed doubles

  BWF International Challenge tournament.
  BWF International Series tournament.
  BWF Future Series tournament.

References

External links 
 

1992 births
Living people
Sportspeople from Lincolnshire
English male badminton players